Union Township is a name or alternative name for several places in the United States:

 Union Township, Branch County, Michigan
 Union Township, Grand Traverse County, Michigan
 Union Charter Township, Michigan, in Isabella County

See also
 Union Township (disambiguation)

Michigan township disambiguation pages